Jannik Fischer (born June 29, 1990) is a Swiss professional ice hockey defenceman. He is currently playing with HC Ambrì-Piotta of the Swiss National League (NL).

Fischer made his National League A debut playing with EV Zug during the 2008–09 NLA season.

References

External links

1990 births
Living people
HC Ambrì-Piotta players
Lausanne HC players
Swiss ice hockey defencemen
People from Baar, Switzerland
Sportspeople from the canton of Zug
EV Zug players